Taxi Taxi may refer to:

 Taxi! Taxi! (1927 film), 1927 American silent film directed by Melville Brown
 Taxi! Taxi! (2013 film), 2013 Singaporean comedy film
 Taxi Taxi, alternate title for the 2002 French film, Taxi 2
 "Taxi Taxi", song by Cher on her Believe album

See also
 Taxi Taxie, a 1977 Bollywood film
 Taxi (disambiguation)